Priyamudan is a 1998 Indian Tamil-language romantic thriller film directed by Vincent Selva. The film stars Vijay  in an antihero role and Kausalya as heroine, while Sujith Sagar plays a pivotal role. The story focuses on Vasanth, a young businessman, who is of a hyper-possessive nature and therefore he tries to achieve whatever he desires using any means. 

The film was released on 12 June 1998 with positive reviews and became a commercial success. The film was remade as Preminche Manasu in Telugu in 2000, as Nata in Kannada in 2002 and in Hindi as Deewana Main Deewana in 2013 and in Sinhala as Rush in 2019.

The film ran for more than 100 days at the box office.

Plot
Vasanth is a son of a wealthy businessman from Chennai and grows up with a possessive attitude, and is almost considered as a psychopath by the audience. This is shown in one scene in a gift shop, where he breaks a gift which he likes solely as it had already been brought by someone else. He pays the owner to cover the damages but responds with a negative tagline - "If I can't get it, nobody can". He happens to visit Rajasthan, where he meets Priya and it is love at first sight for Vasanth. Priya is injured in an accident, and Vasanth's friend Vasanth Kumar rescues her by donating blood. Being unconscious, Priya does not know the face of her savior, only the name "Vasanth Kumar".

After she recovers, Priya comes to Chennai to meet Vasanth Kumar and stays in her uncle's house. However, Vasanth, who needs her at any cost, pretends to be Vasanth Kumar and makes advantage of her soft corner. He also manages to hide her from Vasanth Kumar. One day, Priya and Vasanth go to Sathyam Theater to watch a movie, but he unknowingly learns that Priya and Vasanth Kumar already know each other. He gets angry and breaks the ice creams brought for them.

One day, Vasanth Kumar learns about Priya's and Vasanth's affair and greets them. Priya's father Rangarajan also learns about the affair but not about the possessive Vasanth. Vasanth and Priya go to Jaipur from Chennai to meet Rangarajan. While Priya is away from the home for a small work, Vasanth meets Rangarajan and admits the truth to him, but he refuses. Angered by his action, Vasanth kills him but later realizes his foolish mistake. CBI officers Muthukumaraswamy and Gopal begin to investigate the case.

One day, Vasanth Kumar comes to Jaipur for a music audition, which he had missed when he donated blood to Priya. Vasanth arranges room for him but fears that he might find the truth. He goes to the hospital where Priya was admitted and tears the certificate of admission. Vasanth Kumar sees this, and they go to a nearby hill station. Vasanth Kumar starts arguing with Vasanth for cheating his name. Vasanth apologizes and admits the truth, but Vasanth Kumar abuses Priya. In anger, Vasanth accidentally beats Vasanth Kumar but tries to save him. Having no way, Vasanth Kumar sacrifices his life for his friend's sake. Shocked by this incident, Vasanth decides to transform himself into a good gentleman and thereby leaves his behavior as that of a psychopath. Vasanth then sincerely starts to take care of Priya.

Meanwhile, Muthukumaraswamy and Gopal come to know that the real murderer of Rangarajan and Vasanth Kumar is Vasanth. Priya also learns about this and runs from Jaipur. Vasanth searches for her and is finally beaten by Priya for cheating her lover's name and for killing Rangarajan. After that, she notices her earring, which was taken by Vasanth when he first visited Jaipur. He tells her all the truths and the incidents. She feels sorry for him and decides to reciprocate his love. However, the police shoots Vasanth, and he dies immediately, unable to bear the pain. Priya bursts in tears. The film ends with a sad note with Vasanth advising the audience "not to live like him, because they will realize their terrific destiny".

Alternative ending
When Vasanth was suffering from the pain caused by the police's gunshot, Priya realizes his love for her and reciprocates Vasanth's love. Both Vasanth and Priya hold their hands and runs away from the police. Muthukumaraswamy and Gopal were about to pull out their guns, but they did not stop or shoot Vasanth from escaping. When they asked each other the reason for not stopping them, they explained each other by saying that they know the value and pain of love. They let them go away and live together. The film ends with a happy note with Vasanth got united with Priya and his love being successful.

Cast

Production
Vijay wanted to work with a debutant director and Vincent Selva's story impressed him, prompting Lakshmi Movie Makers to make the story into a feature film. Meena was initially approached for the film, but had to turn the offer down due to her busy schedule. The song "Pooja Vaa" was shot in Bada Bagh, Kuldhara and Jaisalmer, while the film's climax was shot at Kuldhara, Rajasthan. While working for the film, Vijay had an accident and hurt his spine. As a result, Vijay travelled to London for advanced medical treatment, where he ended up meeting his eventual wife, Sangeetha Sornalingam.

Soundtrack

The soundtrack composed by Deva while lyrics were written by Arivumathi, Palani Bharathi, Ponniyin Selvan, Ra. Ravishankar and Vaasan. "White Lakkan" song was based on the Hindi blockbuster hit song, "Hum 
Kaale Hai Tu Kya Hua" from the movie Gumnaam (1965), which was composed by duo composers Shankar Jaikishan and sung by Mohammed Rafi.

Release
The film was released on 12 June 1998.

Reception
A reviewer from Indolink.com praised Vijay for choosing to play an anti-hero role. The Hindu stated that Vijay "made sincere efforts to give shape to the negative character" that "he asserts himself in the climax". The critic goes on to describe that Kausalya "just fills the bill, while Sujit Sagar makes "a neat essay". Ananda Vikatan gave the film a score of 41 out of 100.

Stunt choreographer Jaguar Thangam won the Tamil Nadu State Film Award for Best Stunt Coordinator, for 1998 for his work in Priyamudan.

References

External links
 

1998 films
1990s Tamil-language films
Films scored by Deva (composer)
1990s romantic thriller films
Indian romantic thriller films
Tamil films remade in other languages
Fictional portrayals of the Tamil Nadu Police
Films shot in Rajasthan
Films set in Rajasthan
1998 directorial debut films